Orange is an unincorporated community in Delaware County, in the U.S. state of Ohio.

History
Variant names of Orange were Goodingdale, Orange Station, and Williamsville.

Orange Station was platted in 1852. A post office called Williamsville was established in 1838, the name was changed to Orange Station in 1860, and the post office closed in 1879. A post office called Goodingdale operated from 1898 until 1904.

References

Unincorporated communities in Delaware County, Ohio
Unincorporated communities in Ohio